Admiral James Ryder Burton, KH (1795 -– 2 August 1876) was a British Royal Navy officer.

He was the son of Edmund Burton, the Dean of Killala.

He progressed on the Reserved List to the rank of Admiral on 14 November 1863.

In 1823, he married Anne Maria Plunkett, the widow of Philip Roche of Dublin, who was the youngest daughter of Randal Plunkett, 13th Baron of Dunsany (1739–1821).

He was believed by some to be an heir to an old baronetcy in the Baronetage of England that was possibly dormant, but he did not pursue inheriting it.

References

1795 births
1876 deaths
Royal Navy admirals
Burials at Kensal Green Cemetery